Springfield Plantation is an antebellum house located near Fayette in Jefferson County, Mississippi. It has been associated with many famous people throughout its history.

History

One of the oldest mansions in Mississippi, the Springfield Mansion was built between 1786 and 1791. Green had the house built to show off his wealth. The mansion was one of the first houses in America to have a full colonnade across the entire facade and is the first such mansion to be built in the Mississippi Valley. The whole house was built by his slaves out of clay from the land. The hinges, knobs, and all metal tools were built at the plantation's blacksmith building.

Possibly what makes Springfield Plantation most famous is the wedding that took place there in 1791. Thomas M. Green Sr., the owner's father, was one of the magistrates of the Mississippi Territory and as such, performed the marriage ceremony of Andrew Jackson and Rachel Donelson at the house in August 1791. This marriage would lead to one of the first romantic tragedies in America.

For two years, Green Jr. had to leave his beloved plantation to go to Washington, D.C. when he became a Congressman from the Mississippi Territory. The plantation survived the Civil War and the Union occupation of Mississippi during the later half of the 1800s.

Restoration
After numerous owners over the years, the house decayed for decades. Arthur Edward Cavalier de LaSalle, Arthur LaSalle as he liked to be called, was given a lifetime lease of the home by the owners to repair, live in, and give tours of the mansion in the early 1970s. When asked about the mansion when he first arrived, he said, "It was occupied by the rats and pigeons, nothing else." Springfield is still a working plantation. On August 14, 2008, LaSalle died there. The tours have stopped, but the owners say they will be restarted.

Cemetery
It is not known how many people are buried at the Green Family Cemetery at Springfield Plantation. These are the names of those known.

Thomas M. Green Jr. (1758–1813)--Martha Kirland (1760–1805)
Martha Wills Green (1783–1808)

References

Sources

Springfield Plantation Tour
Springfield Plantation Bio
Location Details and Plantation Size

Plantation houses in Mississippi
Houses in Jefferson County, Mississippi
Houses completed in 1791
Antebellum architecture